= Mrs. Simpson =

Mrs. Simpson may refer to:

- Wallis Simpson, who subsequently married the former King Edward VIII and became known as Her Grace the Duchess of Windsor
- Marge Simpson, a fictional character on the American television series The Simpsons
